Valki was a railway station in Vitebsk Region, Belarus. It was closed in 2011, demolished in 2013.

References 

Railway stations in Belarus
Railway stations opened in 1951
Defunct railway stations